This is a list of 112 species in Puliciphora, a genus of scuttle flies in the family Phoridae.

Puliciphora species

Puliciphora anceps Schmitz, 1915
Puliciphora beaveri Disney, 1988
Puliciphora beckeri Meijere, 1907
Puliciphora boltoni Disney, 1988
Puliciphora borinquenensis Wheeler, 1906
Puliciphora brachymyrmecis (Silvestri, 1911)
Puliciphora browni Disney, 2020
Puliciphora cacaulandiae Disney, 2003
Puliciphora calva Schmitz, 1951
Puliciphora cloveri (Disney, 1989)
Puliciphora collinsi Disney, 1988
Puliciphora convexa Borgmeier, 1960
Puliciphora coprophila Borgmeier, 1960
Puliciphora coptotermitum Disney, 1989
Puliciphora cubensis (Brues, 1932)
Puliciphora decachete Schmitz, 1958
Puliciphora destituta Disney, 1999
Puliciphora ecitophila Disney, 2004
Puliciphora edaphomyia Disney, 2005
Puliciphora epichaeta (Borgmeier, 1960)
Puliciphora etiamodesta Disney, 2005
Puliciphora exachatina Disney, 1988
Puliciphora fenestrata Borgmeier, 1960
Puliciphora flava Malloch, 1914
Puliciphora fosteri Disney, 1999
Puliciphora frivola Borgmeier, 1960
Puliciphora fungicola Yang & Wang, 1993
Puliciphora glacialis Malloch, 1912
Puliciphora gracilis Borgmeier, 1960
Puliciphora grandicoxa Colyer, 1967
Puliciphora hancocki Disney, 2005
Puliciphora haplopyga (Borgmeier, 1969)
Puliciphora haplpyga (Borgmeier, 1969)
Puliciphora hirta (Schmitz, 1951)
Puliciphora ibadanensis Disney, 2002
Puliciphora imbecilla Borgmeier, 1960
Puliciphora imitata Disney, 2008
Puliciphora interrupta Borgmeier, 1960
Puliciphora jacobsoni Schmitz, 1925
Puliciphora jacobsonorum Disney, 1989
Puliciphora jacquemarti Disney, 2005
Puliciphora jeanssoni (Trägårdh, 1909)
Puliciphora karensis Disney, 1998
Puliciphora kerteszi Brues, 1911
Puliciphora kistneri Disney, 1998
Puliciphora knighti Disney, 1988
Puliciphora koghiensis Disney, 2003
Puliciphora laranjae Disney, 2003
Puliciphora legionis Borgmeier, 1960
Puliciphora longipes Schmitz & Mjoberg, 1925
Puliciphora longitergum Disney, 2003
Puliciphora lucifera Dahl, 1897
Puliciphora lunaris Borgmeier, 1960
Puliciphora macrolunarum Disney, 2003
Puliciphora malae Disney, 1990
Puliciphora malaysiae Disney, 1988
Puliciphora matheranensis Brues, 1907
Puliciphora melanis Schmitz, 1951
Puliciphora meneghettii Schmitz, 1951
Puliciphora mexicanae Disney, 2003
Puliciphora microphthalma Schmitz & Mjoberg, 1924
Puliciphora modesta (Borgmeier, 1960)
Puliciphora myrmecophila Brues, 1925
Puliciphora nigeriae Disney, 2002
Puliciphora nigroflava (Borgmeier, 1958)
Puliciphora nudipalpis Malloch, 1912
Puliciphora nuttingi Disney, 1998
Puliciphora obtecta Meijere, 1912
Puliciphora occidentalis (Melander and Brues, 1903)
Puliciphora omnivora Mikhailovskaya, 1993
Puliciphora opuntiae Paulian, 1950
Puliciphora pallicauda Schmitz, 1934
Puliciphora papillata Borgmeier, 1960
Puliciphora parsetosa Disney, 2003
Puliciphora parvula Borgmeier, 1969
Puliciphora parvulunarum Disney, 2002
Puliciphora pauxilla (Borgmeier, 1960)
Puliciphora penangensis Disney, 1988
Puliciphora placida Borgmeier, 1960
Puliciphora profana Borgmeier, 1960
Puliciphora puerilis (Becker, 1908)
Puliciphora pulex Dahl, 1898
Puliciphora pygmaea (Borgmeier, 1960)
Puliciphora qianana Yang & Wang, 1993
Puliciphora rata Borgmeier, 1960
Puliciphora reevesi Disney, 2003
Puliciphora rhodesiana Schmitz, 1934
Puliciphora rosei Disney, 1988
Puliciphora rufipes Silva Figueroa, 1916
Puliciphora russellsmithi Disney, 2002
Puliciphora secosexergum Disney, 2008
Puliciphora sedecimsetarum Schmitz, 19581916
Puliciphora semicimex (Schmitz, 1951)
Puliciphora seriata Borgmeier, 1960
Puliciphora setosa Borgmeier, 1960
Puliciphora sobria Borgmeier, 1960
Puliciphora spirapenis Disney & Mikhailovskaya, 2001
Puliciphora stuckenbergi Disney, 1988
Puliciphora suavis Borgmeier, 1963
Puliciphora subconvexa Borgmeier, 1960
Puliciphora sulcimanae Disney, 1998
Puliciphora sumatrae Disney, 1999
Puliciphora sylvatica Brues, 1909
Puliciphora taigae Disney & Mikhailovskaya, 2001
Puliciphora tambopata Disney, 1989
Puliciphora termitum Schmitz, 1926
Puliciphora togata Schmitz, 1925
Puliciphora tokyoensis Kinoshita, 1918
Puliciphora triangularis (Borgmeier, 1960)
Puliciphora trisclerita Senior-White, 1924
Puliciphora velocipes (Schmitz, 1913)
Puliciphora vicinalis Borgmeier, 1960
Puliciphora viklundi Disney, 2003
Puliciphora virginiensis Malloch, 1912

References

Puliciphora